The Taiwan cupwing or Taiwan wren-babbler (Pnoepyga formosana) is a species of passerine bird in the family Pnoepygidae. The species is endemic to the island of Taiwan. It was treated for a long time as a subspecies of the scaly-breasted cupwing.

Description
The bird is 8 to 9 cm long. The bird seems to be tailless, is olive-brown from above and the plumage has the pattern of fish scales on the chest. The Taiwan wren-babbler is very similar to the scaly-breasted cupwing, with pale-colored scales on an almost black surface. The wings and legs are shorter and the bird is more reddish-brown in color.

References
Collar, N. J. & Robson, C. 2007. Family Timaliidae (Babblers)  pp. 70 – 291 in; del Hoyo, J., Elliott, A. & Christie, D.A. eds. Handbook of the Birds of the World, Vol. 12. Picathartes to Tits and Chickadees. Lynx Edicions, Barcelona.

Taiwan cupwing
Endemic birds of Taiwan
Taiwan cupwing